The following elections occurred in the year 1912.

Asia
 1912 Chinese National Assembly election (first election for the newly founded National Assembly of the Republic of China)
 1912 Philippine Assembly elections

Europe

 1912 German federal election
 1912 Norwegian parliamentary election

United Kingdom
 1912 Bolton by-election
 1912 Bow and Bromley by-election
 1912 Hanley by-election
 1912 Leominster by-election

North America

Canada
 1912 British Columbia general election
 December 1912 Edmonton municipal election
 1912 Edmonton municipal by-election
 February 1912 Edmonton municipal election
 1912 New Brunswick general election
 1912 Prince Edward Island general election
 1912 Quebec general election
 1912 Saskatchewan general election
 1912 Toronto municipal election
 1912 Yukon general election

United States
 1912 United States presidential election
 1912 United States House of Representatives elections in California
 1912 Minnesota gubernatorial election
 1912 New York state election
 1912 United States House of Representatives elections in South Carolina
 1912 United States Senate election in South Carolina
 1912 South Carolina gubernatorial election
 1912 United States House of Representatives elections
 1912 United States Senate elections

United States Senate
 1912 and 1913 United States Senate elections
 1912 United States Senate election in Massachusetts
 1912 United States Senate election in South Carolina

South America

 1912 Argentine legislative election

Oceania

Australia
 1912 South Australian state election
 1912 Tasmanian state election

New Zealand
 1912 Egmont by-election

See also
 :Category:1912 elections

1912
Elections